The 2011–12 A-1 League was the 21st season of the A-1 League, the highest professional basketball league in Croatia.
The first half of the season consisted of 11 teams and 110-game regular season (20 games for each of the 11 teams) began on Friday, October 8, 2011 and ended on Wednesday, March 14, 2012. The second half of the season consisted of 3 teams from ABA League and the best 5 teams from first half of the season. Playoffs started on May 15, 2012 and ended on June 5.

Cibona won its 17th title.

Team information

Venues and locations

Regular season

Champions Round

Relegation and Promotion Rounds

Relegation Round

Promotion Round
Promotion League comprises five regional second division winners.

Relegation/Promotion play-offs
Relegation league 5th-placed team Dubrovnik faces the 2nd-placed Promotion league side Crikvenica in a two-legged play-off. The winner on aggregate score after both matches will earn a spot in the 2012–13 A-1 League.

Dubrovnik vs. Crikvenica

Dubrovnik retained its A-1 League status.

Playoffs

Bracket

Semifinals
The semifinals are best-of-3 series.

Cibona vs. Zadar

Cedevita vs. Split

Finals
The finals are best-of-5 series.

Cibona vs. Cedevita

A-1 League Finals MVP:

External links
Official Site
Eurobasket.com League Page

A-1 Liga seasons
Croatian
A1